Tiny TV was a brand name used by Turner Broadcasting for a slate of international programming blocks that targeted preschool-age children. The block primarily aired on Cartoon Network in countries such as Australia, India, and Southeast Asia. Tiny TV also ran on Boomerang in Latin America (under the name Mini TV) and Southeast Asia, as well as on Pogo TV in India.

Programming

Australian feed

Cartoon Network 

 Dragon Tales
 Little Red Tractor
 Merlin the Magical Puppy
 Postman Pat
 The Secret World of Benjamin Bear

Boomerang 
 The Adventures of Bottle Top Bill and His Best Friend Corky
 Baby Looney Tunes
 Gerald McBoing-Boing
 Ozie Boo
 Postman Pat
 The Secret World of Benjamin Bear
 Meteor and the Mighty Monster Trucks
 Little Red Tractor
 Franklin

Indian feed 
 The Backyardigans
 Barney & Friends
Bob the Builder
Boo!
Boohbah
Dragon Tales
Engie Benjy
Ethelbert the Tiger
Kipper
The Koala Brothers
Little Red Tractor
Make Way for Noddy
Miffy and Friends
Noddy's Toyland Adventures
Oswald
Pingu
Postman Pat
Rubbadubbers
Teletubbies
Thomas & Friends
Tweenies
Twipsy

Latin American feed 
 The Adventures of Bottle Top Bill and His Best Friend Corky
 Arthur (Arturo)
 Animal Crackers
 Bellflower Bunnies
 Betty Toons
 Care Bears (Los Cariñositos)
 Cave Kids
 Curious George (Jorge el Curioso)
 Dive Olly Dive! (Olly el submarino)
 Dragon
 Faireez (Hadas)
 Firehouse Tales
 The Flintstone Kids (Los Pequeños Picapiedra)
 The Forgotten Toys
 Franklin
 Franny's Feet (Los Pies Mágicos de Franny)
 Garfield and Friends (Garfield y sus Amigos)
 Hamtaro
 Hello Kitty
 Kangaroo Creek Gang
 Kipper (Kipper el Perro)
 The Land Before Time (La tierra antes del tiempo)
 The Little Lulu Show (La Pequeña Lulú)
 The Magic School Bus (El Autobús Mágico)
 Maisy
 Max & Ruby (Max y Ruby)
 Maya & Miguel (Maya y Miguel)
 Meteor and the Mighty Monster Trucks  (Las Adventuras de Meteor)
 Miffy and Friends (Miffy y sus amigos)
 Miss Spider's Sunny Patch Friends
 Mona The Vampire (Mona la Vampiro)
 Pecola
 Peppa Pig
 Postcards from Buster (Los viajes de Bustelo)
 Preston Pig
 Pettson and Findus (Pettson y Findus)
 Tom & Jerry Kids (Los Pequeños Tom y Jerry)
 Tractor Tom (Tom, el tractor)
 The Triplets (Las tres mellizas)

Southeast Asian feeds

Cartoon Network 
 A Pup Named Scooby-Doo
 Baby Looney Tunes
 The Flintstone Kids
 Krypto the Superdog
 Tom & Jerry Kids

Boomerang 
 A Pup Named Scooby-Doo
 Baby Looney Tunes
 Care Bears: Adventures in Care-a-lot
 The Flintstone Kids
 Postman Pat
 Tom & Jerry Kids
 The Secret World of Benjamin Bear

Philippine feed 
 The Adventures of Bottle Top Bill and His Best Friend Corky
 A Pup Named Scooby-Doo
 Baby Looney Tunes
 Bob the Builder
 Care Bears
 Firehouse Tales
 The Flintstone Kids
 Gordon the Garden Gnome
 Krypto the Superdog
 The Land Before Time
 Lili's Island
 The Little Lulu Show
 Little People
 Little Red Tractor
 Oswald
 Peep and the Big Wide World 
 Peppa Pig  
 Pingu
 Postman Pat
 Roary the Racing Car
 Thomas & Friends
 Tom & Jerry Kids

References

Television channels and stations established in 2003
Television channels and stations disestablished in 2006
Television programming blocks in Asia
Cartoon Network (Indian TV channel)
Television programming blocks in Australia
Cartoon Network programming blocks